{{Speciesbox
|image = Mecardonia procumbens habit.jpg
|image_caption =
|genus = Mecardonia
|species = procumbens
|authority =  (1903)
|synonyms = Bacopa procumbens'
}}Mecardonia procumbens'' (also known as yellow-flowered waterhyssop), common name baby jump-up, is an annual or perennial herb native to tropical and subtropical regions of the Americas. It has become widely spread in warmer regions worldwide, and is now naturalised on all continents except Antarctica, in addition to most islands with suitable climates.

References

External links

Plantaginaceae
Flora of the South-Central United States
Flora of Mexico
Flora without expected TNC conservation status